Charles Elvin Powell (April 4, 1932 – September 1, 2014) was an American multi-sport professional sportsman as an NFL football player, professional boxer (who once fought both Muhammad Ali and Floyd Patterson), and Minor League baseball player.

Powell was born in Texas. He and his younger brother Art Powell, an NFL wide receiver for the New York Titans and Oakland Raiders in the 1960s, grew up in the Logan Heights area of San Diego, California.

Powell played professional baseball and football as well as boxed.  His greatest success was as an NFL player and a boxer, even boxing against Muhammad Ali.

High school
Charlie starred in football, basketball, track and baseball at San Diego High School. In 1950, as a 6'-3", 230-pound defensive end and offensive end, with tremendous power and speed, he was named the California high school football player of the year. In track, he ran 100 yards in 9.6 seconds and threw the shot put 57 feet 9¼ inches.  In basketball, he was a second-team all-league center.  As a high school baseball player, he hit balls out of San Diego Balboa Stadium.  He turned a down an offer of a tryout by the Harlem Globetrotters.

Baseball career
After high school, Charlie was recruited by Notre Dame and UCLA to play football, St. Louis Browns baseball owner Bill Veeck, who had acquired the legendary pitcher Satchel Paige from the Cleveland Indians, signed the power-hitting outfielder to a professional baseball contract. He was sent to the Stockton Ports, a Class B minor league team.

Football career
But after playing pro baseball in the summer of 1952, Charlie suddenly abandoned his pro baseball career and signed a pro football contract with the San Francisco 49ers. At 19, he became the youngest player in NFL history. In his first game, he started against the NFL champion Detroit Lions and had multiple sacks against QB Bobby Layne, totalling 67 yards in sack yardage.

Powell played five seasons in the NFL for the 49ers (1952–53 and 1955–57) and two for the Oakland Raiders (1960–61).

Boxing career
Powell was also a professional boxer.  In March 1959, on television, he knocked out Nino Valdes of Cuba who was the number 2 ranked heavyweight fighter in the world at the time. He fought Muhammad Ali (who was then known as Cassius Clay) at the Civic Arena in Pittsburgh on January 24, 1963. Ali knocked out Powell in the third round, as Ali predicted before the fight. He finished his pro boxing career with a record of 25-11-3.  In his career, Charlie also fought Floyd Patterson, losing to him in 6 rounds.

Retirement
Powell is a member of the Breitbard San Diego Hall of Fame.  He was last known to be living in the Pasadena, California area.

Death
Powell died on September 1, 2014 at age of 82 after living with dementia for several years.

References

great Charlie Powell dead at 82
San Diego Hall of Champions Sports Museum
First & foremost: Powells are royal family
One of the Best Athletes of All time May Have Been a Boxer
 
The Greatest 49ers Athlete Ever
eSportsInstruction.com - Pro Advisory Board Members

1932 births
2014 deaths
American football defensive linemen
San Francisco 49ers players
Oakland Raiders players
Boxers from Texas
Players of American football from Dallas
Baseball players from Dallas
San Diego High School alumni